Opoku Ware can refer to:
Opoku Ware I (1700–1750), Asantahene, ruler of the Ashanti kingdom in Ghana
Opoku Ware II (1919-1999), 15th Asantahene
Lesley Akyaa Opoku Ware (graduated 1981), Ghanaian ambassador and physician
Opoku Ware School, school in Ghana